Döhl is a German language surname. Spelling variants include Dohl, Döhle and Dohle. The name may refer to:

Friedhelm Döhl (born 1936), German composer 
Karl Gottfried Paul Döhle (1855–1928), German pathologist 
Reinhard Döhl (1934–2004), German writer

See also
Döhlau, a town in Germany
Döhle (IOM) Ltd, a Manx shipping company
Döhle bodies, cellular components
Döhler, a German food company

German-language surnames